Mers El Kébir is a port on the Mediterranean Sea, near Oran in Oran Province, northwest Algeria. It is famous for the attack on the French fleet in 1940, in the Second World War.

History

Originally a Roman port called Portus Divinus, Mers-el-Kébir became an Almohad naval arsenal in the 12th century, fell under the rulers of the Kingdom of Tlemcen in the 13th century, and eventually became a center of pirate activity around 1492. It was fought over by the Ottoman Turks, Portuguese (defeated in the 1501 Battle of Mers El Kebir by Abu Abdallah IV) and Spanish (defeated in the 1507 Battle of Mers-el-Kébir by Abu Abd Allah V), with the Spanish (who named it Mazalquivir) capturing it in 1505 under Cardinal Cisneros. Mazalquivir was the base used to capture neighbouring Oran in 1509. The Spanish held both cities until 1708, when they were driven out by Bey Mustapha Ben Youssef (also known as Bouchelaghem). The Spanish returned in 1732 when the armada of the Duke of Montemar was victorious in the Battle of Aïn-el-Turk and again took Oran and Mazalquivir. Both cities were held until 1792, when they were sold by King Carlos IV to the Dey of Algiers following a siege by the forces of the Dey.

The French occupied it in 1830, and renamed it Saint André de Mers-el-Kébir, enhancing the port in 1868 with an eponymous lighthouse; the latter was destroyed in World War II.

World War II 

Following the German defeat of France in 1940, a portion of the French fleet became holed up in the port. On 3 July 1940, Force H of the British Royal Navy, led by Vice Admiral Sir James Somerville, attacked the French Navy's fleet at Mers-el-Kébir after the French refused to accede to any of Somerville's demands which were designed to ensure the French Navy would not join forces with Nazi Germany like the Vichy French. The attack was successful, although it fueled strong anti-British sentiment in France. However, Britain's resolve against Nazi Germany and France was demonstrated to the United States.  Admiral Somerville sank or shelled three of Gensoul's ships, killing 1,300 sailors.

Post World War II 
After World War II, France used its naval base at Mers-el-Kébir to assist in atomic tests, the base was substantially developed by the French in 1953. 
The Évian Accords of 18 March 1962, which recognized Algerian independence, allowed France to maintain its base for 15 years; however, France withdrew five years later in 1967.

Google Earth imagery has confirmed that a sizeable number of the Algerian National Navy use the naval base at Mers El Kébir. Including the navy's Kilo-class submarine fleet of six boats; as well as other frigates and corvettes.

See also

 Presidio
 European enclaves in North Africa before 1830
 Operation Torch

References

External links

 A plan of the Mers-el-Kébir anchorage
  Accueil Kébir
  MERS EL KEBIR 1940
 Mers-el-Kebir – A Battle Between Friends by Irwin J. Kappes

Aïn El Turk District
Communes of Oran Province
Former Spanish colonies
Cities in Algeria